The 2013 New Zealand Radio Awards were the awards for excellence in the New Zealand radio industry during 2012. It was the 36th New Zealand Radio Awards, and recognised staff, volunteers and contractors in both commercial and non-commercial broadcasting.

This is a list of nominees, with winners in bold.

Winners and nominees

Best Stations

Best Music

Best Talk

Best News

References

New Zealand Radio Awards